Freaktown is a Canadian animated series produced by Portfolio Entertainment, being the first creation of the group's cartoon studio. Devised by Peter Ricq and Philippe Ivanusic, the series premiered on Teletoon on June 20, 2016. Internationally, the series premiered on Disney XD (Southeast Asia) on May 28 & 29, 2016 and is currently airing on Pop Max in United Kingdom, Boing in France, Hungama TV and Disney XD in India and Cartoon Network in Australia and New Zealand.

Plot
The series focuses on Ben Bones, an undead skeleton. Along with his friends, Lenny and Priscilla, they are to protect Freaktown against a massive makeover of the cute and cuddly kind, courtesy of Princess Boo Boo, the spoiled brat ruler of Sweetlandia and her right-hand bear, Lord Cuddles the Fluffy.

Characters

Main
Benjamin Bones (voiced by Landon Norris) – The kind problem-solving protagonist of the show and hero of Freaktown. Ben is an undead skeleton with a soul. He often foils Princess Boo Boo and Lord Cuddles' plans to "sugar frost" Freaktown.
Lenny (voiced by Cory Doran) – Ben's best friend. Lenny is a mutant mantis, who is sometimes shy. But, he's also very endearing. He has the ability to shoot sticky webs.
Priscilla (voiced by Stephanie Lynn Robinson) – Ben and Lenny's best friend. Priscilla is a potion princess and the kind of friend who sees everything, due to the fact that she can take out her eyeballs. She is good at concocting magic potions.
Princess Boo Boo (voiced by Julie Lemieux) – One of the main antagonists. She is the ruler of Sweetlandia. She is a spoiled brat who plans to turn Freaktown into a kind and cuddly paradise.
Lord Cuddles the Fluffy (voiced by Matt Baram) – Another main antagonist. He is Princess Boo Boo's right-hand bear and Freaktown's Mayor. He is the one who normally plans the scheme to ruin Freaktown. Don't let his cuteness and physical size fool you, he is one guy not to be messed with.

Supporting
Taylor (voiced by Jamie Watson) the Warnicorn
Sparkles (voiced by Richard Binsley) – the Wizard

Episodes

Broadcast and release
The series premiered on Cartoon Network in multiple nations including Australia, Japan, Korea, New Zealand, and Taiwan. It's also associated with the Walt Disney Company's Southeast Asia division as well as ABC Australia. Portfolio Entertainment CEO and co-founder Joy Rosen remarked that the company felt "thrilled to land international deals with world-renowned broadcasters right out of the gate", also stating that the series is crammed with laugh-out-loud moments and unpredictable twists that will perfectly complement the highly-entertaining programming available on these major kids’ networks". On October 29, 2016, Portfolio made new deals with Pop Max in the UK, DR Ultra in Denmark, Disney India, and KIDZ in Israel.

See also

Canadian animation

References

Teletoon original programming
2010s Canadian animated television series
2016 Canadian television series debuts
2016 Canadian television series endings
Canadian flash animated television series
Canadian children's animated comedy television series
Canadian children's animated horror television series
Canadian television series with live action and animation
English-language television shows